Gwaii Haanas National Marine Conservation Area Reserve and Haida Heritage Site is a National Marine Conservation Area of Canada. It is located off the coast of the southernmost Haida Gwaii (formerly known as the Queen Charlotte Islands), 130 kilometres off the mainland of British Columbia. It is immediately adjacent to Gwaii Haanas National Park Reserve and Haida Heritage Site.  The level of protection differs from that of the National Park Reserve, however, allowing sustainable use of some natural resources in the area. Gwaii Haanas National Marine Conservation Area Reserve, which covers 3,400 square kilometres, is "a primary feeding habitat" of the humpback whale (North Pacific population) protected by Canada's Species at Risk Act (SARA).

Establishment

Local information sessions and consultation with stakeholders (commercial fishers, tour companies, the Haida, and local residents) began in 2007. In June, 2010, the Canadian parliament formally approved the creation of Gwaii Haanas NMCA Reserve.

The park's establishment was celebrated in a ceremony held at the Haida Heritage Centre in Skidegate, British Columbia, on June 13, 2010.  Canada's Environment Minister, Jim Prentice, and Guujaaw, the President of the Council of the Haida Nation, both spoke at the ceremony.

See also
 List of national parks of Canada

Notes

References

External links

Parks Canada
Park Search Canadian Parks Locator